The Pacific Organised Track System (PACOTS) comprises airways used primarily for travel between Asia and the west coast of North America. Similar to the North Atlantic Tracks, PACOTS routes are flexible due to jet streams. Eastbound tracks are numbered while westbound ones are lettered.

See also

North Atlantic Tracks
Pineapple Express
Siberian Express

References

Air traffic control
Air traffic control in Asia
Air traffic control in North America
Airline routes